Al-Hamadhani is a crater on Mercury. It has a diameter of 186 kilometers. Its name was adopted by the International Astronomical Union in 1979. Al-Hamadhani is named for the Iranian writer Badi' al-Zaman al-Hamadani, who died in 1007 C.E.

Al-Hamadhani is one of 110 peak ring basins on Mercury.

Hollows
Hollows are present within Al-Hamadhani.

References

Impact craters on Mercury